"Speak Low" (1943) is a popular song composed by Kurt Weill, with lyrics by Ogden Nash.

Background
It was introduced by Mary Martin and Kenny Baker in the Broadway musical One Touch of Venus (1943). The 1944 hit single was by Guy Lombardo and his orchestra, with vocal by Billy Leach. 
Actress Ava Gardner (dubbed by Eileen Wilson) and Dick Haymes sang the song in the feature film version of One Touch of Venus (1948).

The tune is a jazz standard that has been widely recorded, both by vocal artists from Billie Holiday and Tony Bennett to the Miracles and Dee Dee Bridgewater, and such instrumentalists as James Moody, Chet Baker, Gerry Mulligan, Bill Evans, Sonny Clark with Donald Byrd and John Coltrane, Roy Hargrove, Coleman Hawkins, Woody Shaw, Bobby Shew, Eumir Deodato and Brian Bromberg. Pianist Walter Bishop Jr. in 1961 recorded an album, Speak Low, featuring the song. Ella Fitzgerald and Joe Pass recorded this in 1983 (on CD Speak Love). Al Caiola's 1961 version reached #105 on Cashbox magazine's "Looking Ahead" survey. Kurt Weill himself also recorded the song.

The opening line "Speak low when you speak, love" is a play of words on a line in William Shakespeare's comedy Much Ado About Nothing (1600), in which Don Pedro says "Speak low if you speak love."

"Speak Low" is featured in the 2014 German film Phoenix.

Barbra Streisand version

In 1993, American singer, songwriter, actress and director Barbra Streisand released a cover of "Speak Low", taken from her twenty-sixth studio album, Back to Broadway (1993).

Critical reception
Larry Flick from Billboard wrote, "Tune from One Touch of Venus has a seductive, shuffling rhythm that blends well with Johnny Mandel's lush orchestration. As always, Streisand is in exemplary vocal form, and this track will prove a total joy to her devoted legion of fans." Sam Wood from Philadelphia Inquirer complimented it as a "lusciously arranged ballad", and "a sinuous rhythm-and-blues reinterpretation" that's "probably Streisand's best chance for a radio hit" since "Memory". Richard Harrington from The Washington Post felt that with Streisand singing low over Mandell's "supple orchestrations, it feels more like a pop song than a show standard."

References

External links
"Speak Low" at Jazz Standards

1943 songs
Songs with music by Kurt Weill
Songs with lyrics by Ogden Nash
Guy Lombardo songs
Lena Horne songs
Barbra Streisand songs
1940s jazz standards